The 1958 Yale Bulldogs football team represented Yale University in the 1958 NCAA University Division football season.  The Bulldogs were led by seventh-year head coach Jordan Olivar, played their home games at the Yale Bowl and finished the season with a 2–7 record.

Schedule

References

Yale
Yale Bulldogs football seasons
Yale Bulldogs football